The 2023 Tenerife Challenger III was a professional tennis tournament played on hard courts. It was the fourth edition of the tournament which was part of the 2023 ATP Challenger Tour. It took place in Tenerife, Spain between 6 and 12 February 2023.

Singles main-draw entrants

Seeds

 1 Rankings are as of 30 January 2023.

Other entrants
The following players received wildcards into the singles main draw:
  Pablo Llamas Ruiz
  Daniel Rincón
  Stefano Travaglia

The following players received entry into the singles main draw as alternates:
  Marek Gengel
  Gianluca Mager

The following players received entry from the qualifying draw:
  Salvatore Caruso
  Giovanni Fonio
  Christian Harrison
  Shintaro Mochizuki
  Abedallah Shelbayh
  Bu Yunchaokete

The following players received entry as lucky losers:
  Matteo Gigante
  Oscar José Gutierrez
  Gian Marco Moroni

Champions

Singles

 Matteo Gigante def.  Stefano Travaglia 6–3, 6–2.

Doubles

 Andrew Harris /  Christian Harrison def.  Luke Johnson /  Sem Verbeek 7–6(8–6), 6–7(4–7), [10–8].

References

2023 ATP Challenger Tour
2023 in Spanish tennis
February 2023 sports events in Spain